The subfamily Dasyurinae includes several genera of small carnivorous marsupials native to Australia: quolls, kowari, mulgara, kaluta, dibblers, phascogales, pseudantechinuses, and the Tasmanian devil. The subfamily is defined largely on biochemical criteria.

Order Dasyuromorphia
 Family Thylacinidae
Family Dasyuridae:  (carnivorous marsupials)
 Subfamily Dasyurinae:
†Wakamatha tasselii Archer & Rich, 1979; Mioc. Aust.
†Dasylurinja kokuminola Archer, 1982; Miocene
†Ankotarinja tirarensis Archer, 1976; Late Oligcene to Early  Miocene
†Keeuna woodburnei Archer, 1976; Late Oligcene to Early  Miocene
 Tribe Dasyurini
 Mulgaras = Dasycercus spp.
 Little red kaluta = Dasykaluta rosamondae
 Kowari = Dasyuroides byrnei
†Dasyuroides achilpatna Archer, 1982
 Quolls = Dasyurus spp.
 Some dasyures = Myoictis and Neophascogale spp.
 Dibbler = Parantechinus apicalis
 Marsupial shrews = Phascolosorex spp.
 False antechinuses = Pseudantechinus spp. (includes sandstone dibbler)
 Tasmanian devil = Sarcophilus harrisii
 Tribe Phascogalini
 Antechinuses = Antechinus spp.
 Other dasyures = Micromurexia, Murexechinus, Murexia, Paramurexia, Phascomurexia spp.
 Phascogales = Phascogale spp.
 Subfamily Sminthopsinae: dunnarts, kultarr, planigales, and ningauas
 Family Myrmecobiidae

References

Strahan, Ronald (1995). The Mammals of Australia, Reed Books, 54

Dasyuromorphs
Mammal subfamilies